Fagerhult Group, AB Fagerhult, is a group of companies that created lighting fixtures with approximately 4,900 employees and operations in more than 30 countries.

The Group includes 12 brands: Fagerhult, iGuzzini, Ateljé Lyktan, LTS, Whitecroft Lighting, Designplan Lighting, Eagle Lighting, I-Valo, Arlight, LED Linear, WE-EF and Veko.

AB Fagerhult has an annual turnover of SEK 5.6 billion (2018) and is listed on the Nasdaq Nordic Exchange in Stockholm.

Group Brands

Business areas

Collection 
architectural applications worldwide

 Ateljé Lyktan
 iGuzzini
 LED Linear
 WE-EF

Premium 
all European markets and for global customers

 Fagerhult
 LTS

Professional 
for selected applications

 Arlight
 Eagle Lighting
 Whitecroft Lighting

Infrastructure 
for critical infrastructure and industrial applications

 Designplan Lighting
 I-Valo
 Veko

References

External links
 http://www.fagerhult.se
 http://www.iguzzini.com
 http://www.arlight.net
 http://www.lts-licht.de
https://www.designplan.co.uk
https://www.designplanleuchten.de
https://www.we-ef.com
https://www.ateljelyktan.se

Manufacturing companies of Sweden
Companies based in Jönköping County
Swedish companies established in 1945